Edgardo Malvestiti (born 2 May 1967) is a former Argentine professional football player and currently manager.

2021 Club Atlético Newells old Boys 1era división

2021 Newells 1era División Fútbol Argentino 
2020 Club Atlético Newells Old Boys Divisiones Inferiores

References 

1969 births
Living people
Argentine footballers
Argentine football managers
C.D. Águila managers
Expatriate football managers in El Salvador
Association football forwards
Sport Boys Warnes managers
Nacional Potosí managers
Club Blooming managers
Universitario de Sucre managers
Club Real Potosí managers